Hypopta corrientina is a moth in the family Cossidae. It is found in Argentina.

References

Natural History Museum Lepidoptera generic names catalog

Hypopta
Moths described in 1882